Mohammad Javad Kia (born August 29, 2001) is an Iranian footballer who plays for Aluminium Arak F.C. in the Persian Gulf Pro League.

References

External links
 

2001 births
Living people
Iranian footballers
Association football goalkeepers
Aluminium Arak players
Shahr Khodro F.C. players